Vindhya Victim Verdict V3 is a 2023 Indian Tamil-language film directed by P. Amudhavanan and starring Varalaxmi Sarathkumar, Paavana Gowda, Esther Anil and Aadukalam Naren. It was released on 6 January 2023.

Plot 

V3 is a fight for their rights and against an injustice on a gang rape-murder and encountered case, achieving a poetic justice with the help of the system which fails initially on due to the undue pressure of representatives and thy people

Cast 
 Varalaxmi Sarathkumar as Sivagami
 Paavana Gowda as Vindhya
 Esther Anil as Viji
 Aadukalam Naren
 Visarnai Kathai Asiriyar Chandra Kumar
 Ponmudi
 Jai Kumar
 Sheeba

Production 
The first look of the film was released by Jayam Ravi on 17 December 2022.

Reception 
The film was released on 6 January 2023 across Tamil Nadu. A reviewer from Dina Thanthi gave the film a mixed review. The critic from Times of india wrote that "While there are a few intriguing moments, the narrative is tad slow and the emotional sequences fail to hit us hard enough". A reviewer from Maalai Malar gave a mixed review.

References

External links 
 

2020s Tamil-language films